Morestel is a commune in the Isère department in south-eastern France.

Geography
Morestel is situated on the old National Highway 75, now RD 1075, between Bourg-en-Bresse and Grenoble.

Population

See also
Communes of the Isère department

References

External links

Official site

Communes of Isère
Isère communes articles needing translation from French Wikipedia